Solanum crispum is a species of flowering plant in the  family Solanaceae, native to Chile and Peru. Common names include Chilean potato vine, Chilean nightshade, Chilean potato tree and potato vine. The small blue fragrant flowers, 2.5 cm in diameter, with prominent yellow ovaries, appear in clusters in summer. They resemble those of the closely related potato. Very small poisonous berries are produced in autumn. The berries start out green, then yellow-orange, and finally purple. The leaves are oval.

The specific epithet crispum means "closely curled".

Cultivation
Solanum crispum is grown as a garden plant. The free-flowering cultivar 'Glasnevin' has gained the Royal Horticultural Society's Award of Garden Merit.

The plant is fast-growing with a long flowering period, typically from midsummer till autumn (fall). It grows well in neutral or slightly alkaline soils that are moist and well drained. Requiring some protection from frost, planting it against a south- or west-facing fence or wall in full sun is recommended.

There is a white form known as 'Album'.

References

External links
 Photographs: growing against a wall in a garden in the Ards Peninsula, Co Down.
  BBC Gardening, from the BBC
 blue potato vine; aka, Climbing Chilean potato tree
 Berries portrait of Solanum crispum glasnerium blue potato vine (this website may underestimate the toxicity of deadly nightshade)

crispum
Vines
Flora of Chile
Flora of Peru
Garden plants of South America